Jan-Ove Palmberg, born 1943, is a Professor of Mechanical Engineering at Linköping University. He received his M.S. and Ph.D. degrees from Chalmers University of Technology in 1969 and 1975 respectively. He was appointed a Professor at the Department of Mechanical Engineering at Linköping University in 1975. In 1983–1990 he was the Dean of the Institute of Technology, in 2003-2006 he was the Head of the Department of Mechanical Engineering, and in 2007 he was the Head of the Department of Management and Engineering.

Awards 
 Robert E. Koski Medal, American Society of Mechanical Engineers, 2009.
 Joseph Bramah Medal, Institution of Mechanical Engineers, 1997.
 Member of the Royal Swedish Academy of Engineering Sciences, 1991.

References

External links 
 Division of Fluid and Mechatronic Systems

1943 births
Living people
Swedish engineers
Academic staff of Linköping University
Members of the Royal Swedish Academy of Engineering Sciences